In music theory, a diminished major seventh chord is a seventh chord composed of a diminished triad and a major seventh. Thus, it is composed of a root note, together with a minor third, a diminished fifth, and a major seventh above the root: (1, 3, 5, 7). For example, the diminished major seventh chord built on C, commonly written as CoM7, has pitches C–E–G–B:

 

Diminished major seventh chords are very dissonant, containing the dissonant intervals of the tritone and the major seventh. They are frequently encountered, especially in jazz, as a diminished seventh chord with an appoggiatura, especially when the melody has the leading note of the given chord: the ability to resolve this dissonance smoothly to a diatonic triad with the same root allows it to be used as a temporary tension before tonic resolution. It is nevertheless infrequently used as a chord in itself.

The chord can be represented by the integer notation {0, 3, 6, 11}.

Diminished major seventh chord table
{| class="wikitable"
!Chord
!Root
!Minor third
!Diminished fifth
!Major seventh
|-
!align=center|CM7
|align=center|C
|align=center|E
|align=center|G
|align=center|B
|-
!align=center|CM7
|align=center|C
|align=center|E
|align=center|G
|align=center|B (C)
|-
!align=center|DM7
|align=center|D
|align=center|F (E)
|align=center|A (G)
|align=center|C
|-
!align=center|DM7
|align=center|D
|align=center|F
|align=center|A
|align=center|C
|-
!align=center|DM7
|align=center|D
|align=center|F
|align=center|A
|align=center|C (D)
|-
!align=center|EM7
|align=center|E
|align=center|G
|align=center|B (A)
|align=center|D
|-
!align=center|EM7
|align=center|E
|align=center|G
|align=center|B
|align=center|D
|-
!align=center|FM7
|align=center|F
|align=center|A
|align=center|C (B)
|align=center|E
|-
!align=center|FM7
|align=center|F
|align=center|A
|align=center|C
|align=center|E (F)
|-
!align=center|GM7
|align=center|G
|align=center|B (A)
|align=center|D (C)
|align=center|F
|-
!align=center|GM7
|align=center|G
|align=center|B
|align=center|D
|align=center|F
|-
!align=center|GM7
|align=center|G
|align=center|B
|align=center|D
|align=center|F (G)
|-
!align=center|AM7
|align=center|A
|align=center|C (B)
|align=center|E (D)
|align=center|G
|-
!align=center|AM7
|align=center|A
|align=center|C
|align=center|E
|align=center|G
|-
!align=center|AM7
|align=center|A
|align=center|C
|align=center|E
|align=center|G (A)
|-
!align=center|BM7
|align=center|B
|align=center|D
|align=center|F (E)
|align=center|A
|-
!align=center|BM7
|align=center|B
|align=center|D
|align=center|F
|align=center|A
|}

References

Seventh chords